Nemophora cupriacella is a moth of the family Adelidae that is found in most of Europe.

The wingspan is .Head ferruginous, forehead in male black. Antennae in male with basal l/8 clothed with rough scales above, in female  gradually thickened towards base. Forewings shining golden - bronze, usually more coppery posteriorly ; sometimes a faintly indicated darker postmedian fascia. Hindwings dark purplish-fuscous.

Adults are on wing from the end of June to July.

The larvae feed on Knautia, Succisa and Scabiosa species.

References

External links
 Images representing  Nemophora cupriacella at Consortium for the Barcode of Life
UKmoths
Microlepidoptera.nl
Lepidoptera of Belgium

Adelidae
Moths described in 1819
Moths of Europe